{{Speciesbox
|name = Yellowwood
|image = Flindersia xanthoxyla flowers.jpg
|image_caption =
|status =
|status_system = 
|genus = Flindersia
|species = xanthoxyla
|authority = (A.Cunn.) ex Hook. Domin
|synonyms_ref = 
|synonyms =
 Flindersia oxleyana F.Muell. nom. illeg.
 Oxleya xanthoxyla A.Cunn. ex Hook.F.Muell.}}
thumb|Habit in the Lockyer ValleyFlindersia xanthoxyla, commonly known as yellowwood, long jack or yellowwood ash, is a species of rainforest tree that is endemic to eastern Australia. It has pinnate leaves arranged in opposite pairs with seven to eleven leaflets, panicles of yellow flowers and woody fruit studded with rough points on the surface.

The trunk is cylindrical and straight with grey or brownish grey bark. The bark features vertical fissures, and is shed in small flakes. The smaller branches show distinct leaf scars, with star-shaped hairs on new growth. The leaflets are bright green above, paler below.

Taxonomy
Yellowwood was first formally described in 1830 by Charles Fraser from an unpublished manuscript by Allan Cunningham who gave it the name Oxleya xanthoxyla. The description was published in William Jackson Hooker's Botanical Miscellany. In 1927 Karel Domin changed the name to Flindersia xanthxyla.

Conservation statusFlindersia xanthoxyla is classified as of "least concern" under the Queensland Government Nature Conservation Act 1992''.

Uses
An ornamental tree, it is also planted for shade. It was previously used for timber in the construction of coaches, cabinet making, flooring, tool handles, lining, ammunition boxes, artificial limbs and joinery. The timber has steam bending qualities. The weight is between 575 and 900 kilograms per cubic metre.

References

xanthoxyla
Sapindales of Australia
Flora of New South Wales
Flora of Queensland
Plants described in 1830